David Hinton is an American poet, and translator who specializes in Chinese literature and poetry.

Life
He studied Chinese at Cornell University, and in Taiwan.  He lives in East Calais, Vermont.

Awards
 1997 Academy of American Poets Harold Morton Landon Translation Award
 fellowship from the Witter Bynner Foundation
 fellowship from the Ingram Merrill Foundation
 fellowship  National Endowment for the Arts
 fellowship  National Endowment for the Humanities.
 2003 Guggenheim Fellowship
 2007 PEN Award for Poetry in Translation
 2014 American Academy of Arts and Letters, Thorton Wilder Award for Translation

Works

Translations
 
 
 
 
 
 
 
 
 
 
 
 
 Forms of Distance by Bei Dao (1994)

Author

Editor

References

External links
 "Author's website"

Year of birth missing (living people)
Living people
American male poets
Cornell University alumni
Chinese–English translators